is the eleventh studio album by Japanese pop band Pizzicato Five. The album was released on October 1, 1998 by Readymade Records. Under the title Playboy & Playgirl, it was released in the United States on April 20, 1999 by Matador Records. The International Playboy & Playgirl Record was reissued on March 31, 2006.

Track listing

Charts

References

External links
 

1998 albums
Pizzicato Five albums
Nippon Columbia albums
Matador Records albums
Japanese-language albums